Crispian may refer to:

 Crispian Hollis (born 1936), English Bishop of Portsmouth
 Crispian Mills (born 1973), English singer, songwriter, and guitarist
 Crispian St. Peters (born 1939 as Robin Peter Smith), English pop singer in the 1960s
 Crispian Steele-Perkins (born 1944), English virtuoso classical trumpeter

See also
Crispin (disambiguation)